Tram Inn railway station was a station to the east of Thruxton, Herefordshire, England. It was named after a local public house, itself named after a tramway that carried coal into Hereford before the modern railway.

The station was opened in 1854, closed to passengers in 1958 and closed completely in 1964.

References

Further reading

Disused railway stations in Herefordshire
Railway stations in Great Britain opened in 1853
Railway stations in Great Britain closed in 1958
Former Great Western Railway stations